James Maddin may refer to:

 Jim Maddin, Canadian politician
 James William Maddin (1874–1961), Canadian lawyer and political figure in Nova Scotia